Andover High School is a public secondary school in Andover, Kansas, United States, and operated by Andover USD 385 school district. There are approximately 850 students in attendance at Andover High School. The school is located at 1744 N. Andover Road. It was formerly connected to the Andover Butler Community College campus. The school mascot is the Trojan. Andover High School shares a stadium with Andover Central High School, their crosstown rival. The high school has 90 academic staff members including the principals.

Extracurricular activities

Athletics
The Trojans compete in the Ark Valley Chisholm Trail League and are classified as a 5A school, the second-largest classification in Kansas according to the Kansas State High School Activities Association. Throughout its history, Andover has won 24 state championships in various sports. Many graduates have gone on to participate in Division I, Division II, and Division III athletics.

State Championships

Notable alumni 
 Jaylyn Agnew  – professional basketball player
 B. Clay Moore - professional comic book writer

See also
 List of high schools in Kansas
 List of unified school districts in Kansas
Other high schools in Andover USD 385 school district
 Andover Central High School in Andover

References

External links
 
 USD 385 School District Boundary Map, KDOT

Public high schools in Kansas
Schools in Butler County, Kansas
1914 establishments in Kansas